Satrandroy is a rural commune in the district of Toamasina II (district), in the region of Atsinanana, on the east coast of Madagascar.
It is a relatively new municipality that gained its status only in 2015.

Access to this municimality is difficult being without road access. The construction of a road of 45 km between Satrandroy  and Ambodilazana until Fito Sahaviavy is presently undertaken by the villagers themselves.

Economy
The economy is based on agriculture. Rice, manioc & corn are grown, other crops are lychee, cloves, cacao, coffee, papaya , banana and sugar cane.

References

Populated places in Atsinanana